Bundey may refer to:
 Bundey, South Australia, a locality northeast of Eudunda in South Australia
 William Henry Bundey (1838–1909), politician and judge in South Australia 
 William Bundey (mayor) (1826–1889), Mayor of Adelaide, South Australia from 1883 to 1886

See also
Bundy (disambiguation)
Hundred of Bundey (disambiguation)
Mount Bundey (disambiguation)